Antipina is a rural locality (a village) in Krasnovishersky District, Perm Krai, Russia. The population was 192 as of 2010. There are 5 streets.

Geography 
Antipina is located 57 km southeast of Krasnovishersk (the district's administrative centre) by road. Parshakova is the nearest rural locality.

References 

Rural localities in Krasnovishersky District